Associate of the Royal College of Music (ARCM) is a diploma qualification of the Royal College of Music, equivalent to a university first degree.   Like the Licentiate of the Royal Academy of Music diploma (LRAM), it was offered in teaching or performing, however unlike the latter it is no longer available.

There is no obvious successor to the ARCM diploma, since the college's undergraduates now follow a BMus(Hons) course accredited by the college itself; although in 2012 approximately a quarter of the academic staff included ARCM in their lists of qualifications.

 When the basic Graduate course led to the Graduate of the Royal Schools of Music (GRSM) diploma, a condition of graduating was an ARCM pass in Teaching or Performing, achieved no later than a year before graduation.

Those awarded the diploma are entitled to use the post-nominal letters ARCM and to wear the appropriate academic dress: black bachelors' gown with a royal blue silk hood of simple shape, the cowl part-lined 3 inches and bound 1/4 inch with old gold silk, the neckband fully lined and bound 1/4 inch of old gold silk.

Holders of the ARCM diploma were able to obtain fully qualified teacher status following successful completion of a one year's post graduate study at a college of education in the UK.

References 

Royal College of Music
Performing arts education in the United Kingdom